Anne Boileau (born 16 July 1975) is a French table tennis player. She competed in the women's singles event at the 2000 Summer Olympics.

References

External links
 

1975 births
Living people
French female table tennis players
Olympic table tennis players of France
Table tennis players at the 2000 Summer Olympics
People from Les Sables-d'Olonne
Sportspeople from Vendée
20th-century French women
21st-century French women